Bagha is an upazila of the Rajshahi District, located in Bangladesh's Rajshahi Division.

Geography
It has 29056 households and total area 184.25 km2.

Bagha Upazila is bounded by Charghat Upazila and Bagatipara Upazila, the latter in Natore District, on the north, Lalpur and Bagatipara Upazilas, both in Natore District, on the east, Daulatpur Upazila, Kushtia in Khushtia District, on the south and Jalangi CD Block, in Murshidabad district, West Bengal, India, on the west.

Demographics
According to 2011 Bangladesh census, Bagha had a population of 184,183. Males constituted 49.96% of the population and females 50.04%. Muslims formed 94.70% of the population, while Hindus 5.21%, Christians 0.03% and others 0.07%. Bagha had a literacy rate of 49.65% for the population 7 years old and above.

History 

Alaipur village of Bagha was the headquarters of Laskar Khan Jaigirdar during the sixteenth century. Hazrat Shah Doulah settled at Bagha and started preaching Islam after being granted42 parganas by the rulers. He also established a famous madrasa here. Bagha thana of present-day Rajshahi district was a thriving centre of learning in the early Muslim period. The place became famous after Shah Muazzam Danishmand (Maulana Shah Daula) from Baghdad settled there during the reign of the Sultan of Bengal Nasiruddin Nasrat Shah (1519–32) and built his khanqah there. An inscription table of the time of Sultan Nusrat Shah was discovered there that records the construction of a Jam’i mosque in 930 A.H. (1523-24 A.D.) One Abdul Latif visited the Bagha madrasah in 1609. There he met an elderly Sufi named Hawadah Main (Maulana Hamid Danishmand) son of Maulana Shah Daula, who was running a madrasah and a khanqah in a peaceful environment. Probably the madrasah was established during the reign of Nusrat Shah.

During the Bangladesh Liberation War of 1971, temporary camps were founded by the Pakistan Army in places such as Narayanpur, Bagha, Pakuria, Arani, Alaipur and Chawkrajapur, and many brawls took place in these camps against the 400 Bengali freedom fighters of Bagha. 7 of these freedom fighters were murdered.

Administration
Bagha Upazila is divided into two Municipal Corporations and seven Union Parishads.

Municipal Corporations:
 Arani Municipality
 Bagha Municipality

Union Parishads:
 Arani
 Bajubagha
 Bausa
 Gargari
 Manigram
 Pakuria
Chakrajapur
The union parishads are subdivided into 99 mauzas and 78 villages.

Chairmen

Economy and tourism

Bagha Upazila is home to 343 mosques, most notably the ancient Bagha Mosque complex which also contains the mazar (mausoleum) of Shah Dawlah, a key figure who propagated Islam in the region. The mazar of Dilal Bukhari is in Alaipur. The indigo factory (nilkuthi) at Mirganj is a relic of the colonial period, and is currently used as a silk factory. Bagha Museum is also a tourist spot of Bagha Upazila.

Education
There a number of madrasas in Bagha Upazila which provide educational services to the local community. Some of these include:

Notable people
Shahriar Alam, MP, the State Minister for Foreign Affairs of the People's Republic of Bangladesh. 
Polan Sarkar, social activist. 
Nazmul Hoque Sarkar, lawyer.

See also
Upazilas of Bangladesh
Districts of Bangladesh
Divisions of Bangladesh
Shah Makhdum Rupos, medieval Iraqi saint who visited the area

References

External links
 Official Website
 

Upazilas of Rajshahi District